Nepisiguit was a provincial electoral district for the Legislative Assembly of New Brunswick, Canada.  It was known as Nepisiguit-Chaleur from 1974 to 1995.

Members of the Legislative Assembly

Election results

Nepisiguit

Nepisiguit-Chaleur

References

External links
Website of the Legislative Assembly of New Brunswick

Former provincial electoral districts of New Brunswick